USS Okala (ARST-2) was a  of the United States Navy.

Service history 
She was laid down on 1 December 1944 as LST-1099 by the Jeffersonville Boat and Machine Company in Jeffersonville, Indiana. She was named Okala on 23 December 1944 and commissioned on 28 June 1945 with Lieutenant Louis Silver commanding.

After a monthlong shakedown in the Gulf of Mexico, Okala transited the Panama Canal and steamed to Buckner Bay in Okinawa on 27 September. She was based there until transfer to Yokosuka in late November.  She sailed to Seattle on 25 March 1946 and was decommissioned there on 5 August 1946, struck on 15 October 1946 and sold 25 July 1947.

References 

1945 ships
Laysan Island class salvage craft tenders
World War II auxiliary ships of the United States
Ships built in Jeffersonville, Indiana